Noupoort is a small town in the eastern Karoo region of South Africa.

The town lies 54 km south of Colesberg and 45 km north of Rosmead Junction on the N9 National Route. It was laid out on a portion of the farm Caroluspoort, was administered by a village management board from 1937 and attained municipal status in 1942. Afrikaans for ‘narrow pass’, the name refers to a gap in the Carlton Hills 27 km to the north-west.

It revolved principally around the railways and is still used as traction change-over facility from diesel to electric locomotives on the Noupoort-Bloemfontein line. It was serviced by Midlandia, a locomotive complex a few kilometres to the south of town, especially during the diesel era up to the late 1900s. Nowadays it links up with the electrified line to De Aar, part of the main artery for iron ore and manganese exports from the Northern Cape through Port Elizabeth harbour on the south coast.

Commercial activity in Noupoort is heavily dependent on railway activity. After a long period of increasingly less demand on the rail network, the town suffered from a drastic decline in local business leading to increasingly dire socioeconomic conditions for the local population. Poverty increased concomitantly with the decline in rail activity.

Christian Care Centre 

In 1992, the Noupoort Christian Care Centre was established with the purpose of drug and alcohol rehabilitation in the area. The Centre took advantage of run down existing infrastructure to build a large centre. The remoteness of Noupoort soon promoted the centre as the last resort for rehabilitation.

The town's reaction was initially negative to hosting such a rehabilitation program and the program was received with much suspicion, which proved to be true after multiple abuse cases and deaths which occurred due to negligence.

References

Populated places in the Umsombomvu Local Municipality